The 2009–10 CHL season was the 18th season of the Central Hockey League (CHL). The season run from October 16, 2009 until March 20, 2010, followed with the Ray Miron President's Cup playoffs.

The 2010 Central Hockey League All-Star Game was on January 13, 2010 at the Laredo Entertainment Center.

The season ended on May 4, 2010 when the Rapid City Rush defeated the Allen Americans in double overtime.

League business
The Allen Americans (Allen, TX) and the Missouri Mavericks (Independence, MO) were added, the New Mexico Scorpions and Oklahoma City Blazers folded, and the Rocky Mountain Rage suspended operations, with hopes of rejoining the league for the 2010–11 season.

Regular season

Conference standings

Note: GP = Games played; W = Wins; L = Losses; OTL = Overtime loss; Pts = Points; GF = Goals for; GA = Goals against

y – clinched conference title; x – clinched playoff spot; e – eliminated from playoff contention

Playoffs

Playoff Bracket

CHL awards
Source:Central Hockey League Historical Award Winners

See also
 Ray Miron President's Cup
 2010 Central Hockey League All-Star Game
 List of 2009–10 CHL Oakley Awards

References

External links
Central Hockey League website
2010 CHL All-Star Game

 
2009-10
CHL